The Conspicuous Service Cross is a decoration for military service awarded by the State of New York.

Eligibility
The general criteria for the New York State Conspicuous Service Cross require an individual to be:

A current New York State citizen OR
A New York State citizen while serving on federal active duty
 A current or former full-time military person serving in the Armed Forces of the United States for purposes other than training since 1917; Active Guard/Reserve AGR excepted
 Currently serving under honorable conditions or honorably discharged from active duty
 A recipient of at least one of the following decorations:
Medal of Honor
Distinguished Service Cross
Navy Cross
Air Force Cross
Defense Distinguished Service Medal
Distinguished Service Medal (U.S. Army)
Distinguished Service Medal (Navy-Marine Corps)
Distinguished Service Medal (Air Force)
Distinguished Service Medal (Coast Guard)
Silver Star
Defense Superior Service Medal
Legion of Merit
Distinguished Flying Cross
Soldier's Medal
Navy and Marine Corps Medal
Airman's Medal
Coast Guard Medal
Bronze Star Medal
Purple Heart
Defense Meritorious Service Medal
Meritorious Service Medal
Air Medal

The Conspicuous Service Cross is also awarded to those members of the New York Organised Militia who were prisoners of war, served at Pearl Harbor on December 7, 1941, directly participated in the Invasion of Normandy on June 6, 1944, or have been declared by the Department of Defense as killed or missing in action.  It may also be awarded for conspicuous service to the State of New York.

See also
Conspicuous Service Medal (New York)

References

Conspicuous Service Cross

State awards and decorations of the United States
Government of New York (state)